FOCAL International is the trade association representing stock footage companies, post-production facilities and individuals involved in the use of footage, still images and audio in all forms of media production. It represents more than 300 companies and individuals involved in media production, asset management, preservation of historical archives, film restoration and post-production.

History
FOCAL International was founded in 1985 by an international group of library archive leaders, specialising in film, television and news content who knew each other largely through licensing film and television archives. 
The high cost of Archive management, preservation and storage and the introduction of new formats was also endangering many film based collections. The founders included Jill Hawkins from BBC Enterprises (now BBC Worldwide), Pam Turner of Visnews, David Warner of ITN, George Marshall of British Pathe, Sten Frykholm from the Swedish broadcaster SVT, Jacque Blanchard, from the Canadian Broadcasting Corporation, and Patricia Gang of National Geographic. 
With the support of a close group of individuals from both BBC and Visnews including Alan Stoner, Jeremy Cantwell, David Wratten as well as researchers Kirsty MacCalman and Jane Mercer, FOCAL launched officially at MIPCOM in 1987.

Its first patron was David Puttnam, who became Chair of Patrons in 2005.

Structure
FOCAL International is run by a small administration team in the UK, reporting to an international Executive Council, comprising a Chair, and a number of representatives of member bodies.

FOCAL International seeks to implement its objectives through its committees, which are made up of industry experts and representatives. These committees include: the Editorial Committee, responsible for the quarterly magazine "Archive Zones"; the Events & Exhibitions Committee, responsible for organising the FOCAL International Awards, and FOCAL International’s presence at relevant trade and industry events; the Training Committee, responsible for providing and promoting training in the archive industry, and raising awareness of the need for preservation of archives; and the Funding & Lobbying Committee, which lobbies governmental and institutional bodies on behalf of its members.

FOCAL International Awards
The FOCAL International Awards were established in 2004 to support and honour the researchers, technicians and producers who uncover, preserve and utilise archive footage in their work. The award ceremony is held annually in London, UK.

The Awards cover categories for the best use of footage in factual productions, history arts & entertainment, music, sports, natural history, short format and cinema.  Further categories include best restoration or preservation project, Jane Mercer Researcher of the Year, plus two additional personnel Awards for FOCAL Member Company of the Year & Footage Person of the Year.  The FOCAL Executive Board also bestow the Lifetime Achievement Award.

Notable winners have included: 
 Rick Prelinger: Lifetime Achievement Award, 2012
 Pathe News: Footage Library of the Year, 2012
 Britain At War:, by the Imperial War Museum Film Archives: Best Use of Footage in a Home Entertainment Release, in 2012
 Senna: Best Use of Sports Footage and Best Use of Footage in a Cinema Release, 2012
 Fire in Babylon: Best Use of Footage in a Cinema Release, 2011
 Martin Scorsese: Best Restoration or Preservation Project, 2010 (for the restoration of The Red Shoes)
 JFK: 3 Shots That Changed America: Best Use of Footage in Factual Productions, 2010
 Focus on Film, run by The National Archives: Best Use of Footage on Non-television Platforms, 2008.
Stewart Binns: Archive Award, 2004 & 2005

Members
Companies and organisations that are members of FOCAL International include:

 Agence France-Presse
 AP Archive
 BAFTA (Industry Partner)
 BAPLA (Industry Partner)
 BBC Motion Gallery
 Bridgeman Art Library
 British Pathe
 Channel 4
 Corbis
 Film Archive Forum (Industry Partner)
 Fremantlemedia Archive
 Getty Images
 Imperial War Museum Film and Video Archive
 ITN Source
 The NHK Visual & Audio Archives (Japan)
 The National Archives of Singapore
 The National Film and Sound Archive (Australia)
 The National Film Board of Canada
 The National Screen and Sound Archive of Wales
 Natural History New Zealand Moving Images
 The Norwegian Broadcasting Corporation
 The Pinewood Studios Group
 The Press Association
 S4C (Wales)
 Science Photo Library
 Seven Network (Australia)
 SVT (Sweden)
 The Scottish Screen Archive at the National Library of Scotland
 T3Media
 Wellcome Library Moving Images & Sound Collection
 Yle (Finland)

References

External links
 FOCAL International

Film organisations in the United Kingdom
Arts and media trade groups